The Embassy of Zimbabwe in London is the diplomatic mission of Zimbabwe in the United Kingdom. It is located in Zimbabwe House, a Grade II* Listed Building at 429 Strand in central London. It was previously a High Commission and became an embassy after Zimbabwe's departure from the Commonwealth on 7 December 2003 in protest of international criticism of Robert Mugabe's regime's human rights record and its policies.

History

Architecture and sculptures

The building was designed by architect Charles Holden in 1907–08 as the headquarters of the British Medical Association and featured a series of sculptures by Jacob Epstein representing the development of science and the Ages of Man, his first major commission in London. The nakedness of many of these sculptures was considered shocking by certain sections of the press, with the London Evening Standard newspaper launching an attack on the sculptures as soon as the protective hoardings were removed. The newspaper claimed, that Epstein had erected "a form of statuary which no careful father would wish his daughter, or no discriminating young man, his fiancée, to see". With the acquisition of the building by the Government of Southern Rhodesia in 1935 the battle over the statues continued as the Southern Rhodesian regime sought permission to have the sculptures removed. Despite claims that one of the heads of the sculptures fell onto a passer-by, thereby giving the Southern Rhodesians an excuse to mutilate the sculptures, there is no evidence that this is the case. Rather what seems to have happened is that a piece of one of the sculptures came away as bunting attached to them to celebrate the coronation of King George VI in 1936 was being removed. Epstein believed this was used by the Southern Rhodesians as an excuse to mutilate the statues on safety grounds. Despite protests, no independent survey was permitted and Epstein himself was refused permission to inspect the sculptures to see if they were as dangerous as claimed.

Rhodesian High Commission
As Rhodesia House it housed of the High Commission of Southern Rhodesia from 1923 until the Rhodesian UDI on 11 November 1965. Rhodesia was unique in being the only British colony to have a High Commission, as only dominions (and later, independent Commonwealth members) were represented by such legations. During the period of the Federation of Rhodesia and Nyasaland from 1953, Rhodesia House was home to the High Commissioner for the Federation. With the end of the Federation in 1963, Rhodesia House returned as home of the representative of Southern Rhodesia.

After the UDI, Rhodesia's High Commissioner, Brigadier Andrew Skeen departed on 12 November 1965 before being declared persona non-grata by the British Government and ordered to leave the country. However, because of concerns over diplomatic property under international law, Rhodesia House was not seized by the British Government. It simply became a Representative Office with no official diplomatic status, until the country became Zimbabwe in 1980.

Zimbabwe

The embassy is frequently the focus of protests against the Zimbabwean government and the regime of President Robert Mugabe.

The South African Business Day newspaper reported in 2002 that the deeds of the building had been given to the Libyan leader Muammar Gaddafi as surety for oil supplied to Zimbabwe by the Libyan state oil company Tamoil.

Notes

References

External links
BBC On This Day —

Londonist.com
Image of building
Image of mutilated sculptures

History of Zimbabwe
London
Zimbabwe
Charles Holden buildings
Buildings and structures in the City of Westminster
United Kingdom–Zimbabwe relations
Rhodesia–United Kingdom relations
Zimbabwe and the Commonwealth of Nations
Covent Garden